Smile and the World Smiles With You is the second full-length album by the post-rock band Sonna.

Track listing

 "Frone Taj"
 "Open Ended"
 "One Most Memorable"
 "The Right Age"
 "Smile"
 "And the World Smiles with You"

Sonna albums
2003 albums
albums produced by Steve Albini